The Kaatskill Kaleidoscope is the world's largest kaleidoscope, measuring  in height. It is located in Mount Tremper, New York. It is housed in a converted grain silo. It was designed by 1960s psychedelic artist Isaac Abrams and his son Raphael. It cost $250,000 to build and opened in 1996.  Catskills developer Dean Gitter is credited with creating the concept for its construction.

"Kaatskill" is the original spelling of "Catskill", as used by the 17th-century Dutch settlers in this area.

References

External links
Kaatskill Kaleidoscope visit

Tourist attractions in Ulster County, New York